Song Seung-heon (born October 5, 1976) is a South Korean model and actor. He has acted in various television dramas, notably Autumn in My Heart (2000), East of Eden (2008), My Princess (2011), Black (2017), Player (2018), The Great Show (2019), and Dinner Mate (2020). His latest on-screen appearance was in the fourth season of Voice (2021).

Career

1995–2004: Beginnings and Pan-asia stardom
Song Seung-heon began his career in 1995 as a model for the jeans brand 292513=STORM, and first became known to viewers in the popular sitcom Three Guys, Three Girls in 1996. The following year he debuted as an actor. His feature film debut came in 1999 in the film Calla co-starring Kim Hee-sun.

True stardom came to Song in late 2000, with the broadcast of the hugely popular TV drama Autumn in My Heart. The romantic melodrama series was a ratings success, pioneering a trend in Korean melodramatic series and launching a fever that is commonly referred to as the "Korean Wave" and leading to Song becoming a Hallyu star. Since then he has been actively recruited for film roles and advertisements in Japan, Hong Kong and other Asian countries.

In 2002, Song starred in the action comedy Make It Big by director Cho Ui-seok, and also in the Hong Kong film So Close with actresses Karen Mok, Shu Qi and Zhao Wei.

Song further solidified his status as a Hallyu (Korean Wave) star in 2003 with Summer Scent, co-starring Son Ye-jin. The series is the third "season-themed" Yoon Seok-ho TV drama after Autumn in My Heart and Winter Sonata, but did not become as popular as the ones that preceded it.

In 2004, Song appeared in two films, but neither was a success: Ice Rain, shot in the Canadian Rockies, failed to enthuse viewers with its mixture of mountaineering and melodrama, while He Was Cool, based on an internet novel by Guiyeoni, was unable to compete with Harry Potter and the Prisoner of Azkaban and other films from the 2004 summer season.

2005–2007: Enlistment and scandal 
Meanwhile, in late 2004, just as he was getting ready to start shooting another high-profile TV drama Sad Love Story, it was revealed that the actor had illegally avoided his compulsory military service by submitting tainted urine samples that suggested he was suffering from certain illnesses and was thus unfit for the army. Amidst the press coverage and scandal this aroused, Song agreed to immediately serve his two-year term in the military. Song was discharged on November 15, 2006, with the rank of corporal, to much fanfare and media attention. For a time he kept a low profile, trying to gauge public opinion on his return to the entertainment world.

2008–2013: Comeback
For his comeback, Song took on a tough image, playing aggressive and masculine roles in the 2008 drama East of Eden, which he won the "Daesang" (Grand Prize) for at the MBC Drama Awards. He also starred in the action film Fate, and the 2010 remake A Better Tomorrow.

His popularity in Japan continued, and in 2010 he starred in Ghost remake Ghost: In Your Arms Again with Matsushima Nanako.

In 2011, Song starred in My Princess opposite Kim Tae-hee, his first romantic comedy. He considers the series a turning point in his career, saying, "Previously, I took on characters living a life full of ups and downs. For me, Hae-young was the first character that was so rich, bright and cheerful. I felt much lighter while acting the character."

His 30-minute short film Lucid Dreaming, helmed by director Chang of 2008 feature Death Bell, was shot particularly for his fans in China and Japan and released on DVD in early 2012.

Based on the original comic by Motoka Murakami and previously dramatized in Japan, in 2012's Dr. Jin Song played the titular smart and cold-hearted surgeon who takes a journey back through time to the late 19th century Joseon Dynasty (1392-1910). He then played a cold-hearted loan shark and gangster who morphs into a successful businessman for his love in 2013 melodrama When a Man Falls in Love.

2014–present: Mature roles
In 2014, Song starred in Kim Dae-woo's erotic period film Obsessed. Set in 1969 at the end of the Vietnam War, he played a high-ranking officer suffering from post-traumatic stress disorder who falls into an obsessive love affair with his subordinate's wife.

In 2015, he starred in the Chinese romantic melodrama The Third Way of Love, followed by family comedy Wonderful Nightmare. Song was next cast as a fighter pilot in his second Chinese project, World War II film Air Strike. He is also set to star in the film Man of Will, portraying a cruel and cold-hearted prison director.

Back on the Korean screen in 2017, Song starred opposite Lee Young-ae in period drama Saimdang, Memoir of Colors, about the Joseon artist and calligrapher Shin Saimdang; Song played a fictional character, an aristocrat and painter who has loved the heroine since childhood. The same year, he was cast in the fantasy thriller drama Black alongside Go Ara, playing the role of a grim reaper. Song reunited with Black director Ko Jae-hyun in another OCN drama Player in 2018, playing the role of a con-artist.

In 2019, Song starred in the political family comedy drama The Great Show.
In April 2019, Song signed with new agency King Kong by Starship.

In 2020, Song starred in the romance drama Dinner Mate as a psychiatrist.

In 2021, Song took the role as the main lead in the fourth season of Voice.

Other activities 
In 2009 he founded his own management agency, Storm S Company (later renamed Better ENT, now majority-owned by KOSDAQ-listed Signal Entertainment Group). It currently manages actors Kim Min-jung, Chae Jung-an and Goo Jae-yi. Song also owns the Sinsa-dong branch of Italian restaurant chain Blacksmith, launched by Caffe Bene.

In 2011, Song was named PR ambassador for cultural sharing by the Korea Foundation. His role was to promote Korean language, food and other cultural heritages overseas. In 2015, he was named as a promotional ambassador for the National Tax Service.

Filmography

Film

Television series

Web series

Web shows

Music video appearances

Discography

Awards and nominations

State honors

References

External links
 공식 홈페이지

1976 births
Living people
20th-century South Korean male actors
21st-century South Korean male actors
King Kong by Starship artists
Better ENT artists
South Korean male television actors
South Korean male film actors
South Korean male models
Models from Seoul
Male actors from Seoul
Draft evaders